The Diocese of Frascati (Lat.: Tusculana) is a suburbicarian see of the Holy Roman Church and a diocese of the Catholic Church in Italy, based at Frascati, near Rome. The bishop of Frascati is a Cardinal Bishop; from the Latin name of the area, the bishop has also been called Bishop of Tusculum. Tusculum was destroyed in 1191. The bishopric moved from Tusculum to Frascati, a nearby town which is first mentioned in the pontificate of Pope Leo IV. Until 1962, the Cardinal-Bishop was concurrently the diocesan bishop of the see in addition to any curial duties he possessed.  Pope John XXIII removed the Cardinal Bishops from any actual responsibility in their suburbicarian dioceses, and made the title purely honorific.

Relationships during the 17th century

Like other dioceses close to Rome, Frascati became a bishopric of choice for Cardinals of powerful papal families during the 17th century; a period known for its unabashed nepotism. Frascati Bishops of that era were significantly intertwined:

 Odoardo Farnese (1624–1626) – uncle of Odoardo Farnese, Duke of Parma against whom the Barberini fought the First War of Castro.
 Bonifazio Bevilacqua Aldobrandini (1626–1627) - adopted "nephew" of Aldobrandini family Pope Clement VIII whose grand-niece Olimpia Aldobrandini married Camillo Pamphili, nephew of Pope Innocent X.
 Marcello Lante della Rovere (1629–1639) – previous Bishop of Palestrina (the comune owned by the Barberini) uncle of Ippolito Lante Montefeltro della Rovere who was a close friend and counsel to Maffeo Barberini.
 Giulio Cesare Sacchetti (1652–1655) – twice nominated for the papacy by Antonio Barberini.
 Antonio Barberini (1655–1661) – nephew of Pope Urban VIII, brother of Taddeo Barberini (Prince of Palestrina), exiled by Pope Innocent X, later helped engineer the marriage of his nephew Don Maffeo Barberini to the grand-niece of Pope Innocent X.
 Girolamo Colonna (1661–1666) – brother of Anna Colonna (wife of Taddeo Barberini, nephew of Pope Urban VIII), uncle of Don Maffeo Barberini and brother-in-law of Antonio Barberini.
 Carlo Rossetti (1676–1680) – prelate to Pope Urban VIII and Antonio Barberini, supporter of Giulio Cesare Sacchetti

Bishops

To 1200
Sisinnius (732)
Nicetas (743–745)
Pietro (847)

Bishops of Labico

Pietro (761)
Giorgio (826)
Pietro (853–869)
Leo (879)
Lunisso (963–968)
Benedetto (998–999)
Leo (?) (1004)
Johannes Homo (1015)
Domenico (1024–1036)

Bishops of Tusculum

 Giovanni (1044)
 Pietro (before 1057 – after 1062)
 Giovanni (1065–1071)
 Giovanni Minuto (1073–1094)
 Bovo (1099)
 Giovanni 'Marsicano'
 Divizo (1121–1122)
 Gilles of Paris (1123–1139) 
 Imar (or Icmar), Benedictine (1142–1161)
Teobaldo (1162), pseudocardinal
 Ugo Pierleoni (1166)
 Martino (or Marino) (1167–1174/78), pseudocardinal
 Odon de Soissons (1170–1171)
 Pietro da Pavia (1179—1182)

1200–1400

Bishops of Frascati

 Nicola de Romanis (1204–1219)
 Nicola de Chiaromonte (or Chiaramonti), Cistercian (1219–1227)
 Jacques de Vitry (1229–1240)
 Odo of Châteauroux, Cistercian (1244–1273)
 João Pedro Julião (1273–1276)
 Ordonho Alvares, Ordonius (1278–1285)
 Giovanni Boccamazza (1285–1309)
 Bérenger Frédol (1309–1323)
 Bertrand Augier de la Tour (1323–1332 or 1333)
 Annibale di Ceccano (1333–1350)
 Guillaume Court (1351–1361)
 Nicola Capocci (1361–1368)
 Gilles Aycelin de Montaigu (1368–1378)
 Thomas of Frignano (1378–1381)
 Guillaume de Chanac (1383), appointed by Clement VII of the obedience of Avignon
 Pietro Pileo di Prata (1385–1387 and again 1391–1401)
 Jean Rolland (1385–1388), appointed by Clement VII of the obedience of Avignon
 Jean de La Grange (before 1394–1402),  appointed by Clement VII of the obedience of Avignon

1400–1600

 Enrico Minutoli (1405–1409)
 Pierre Girard (1402–1415)
 Angelo Corraro (1415–1417)
 Baldassare Cossa (1419)
 Antonio Panciera (1431)
 Hugues de Lusignan (1436–1442)
 Louis II de Luxembourg (1442–1443)
 Giuliano Cesarini (1444)
 Bessarion (1449–1468)
 Latino Orsini (1468–1477)
 Giacomo Ammannati-Piccolomini (1477–1479)
 Giovanni Battista Zeno (1479–1501)
 Jorge da Costa (1501–1503)
 Lorenzo Cybo de Mari (1503)
 Antonio Pallavicini (1503–1505)
 Giovanni Antonio Sangiorgio (1505–1507)
 Bernardino López de Carvajal (1507–1508)
 Guillaume Briçonnet (1508–1509)
 Domenico Grimani (1509–1511)
 Philippe de Luxembourg (1511–1519)
 Alessandro Farnese (1519–1523)
 François Guillaume de Castelnau-Clermont-Ludève (1523–1541)
 Marino Grimani (1541–1543)
 Philippe de la Chambre (1543–1550)
 Gian Pietro Carafa (1550–1553)
 Jean du Bellay (1553–1555)
 Rodolfo Pio (1553–1555)
 Juan Álvarez de Toledo (1555–1557)
 Francesco Pisani (1557–1562)
 Federico Cesi (1562 or 1562–1564)
 Giovanni Girolamo Morone (1562–1565)
 Alessandro Farnese the younger (1565–1578)
 Giacomo Savelli (1578–1583)
 Giovanni Antonio Serbelloni (1583–1587)
 Alfonso Gesualdo (1587–1589)
 Innico d'Avalos d'Aragona (1589–1591)
 Tolomeo Gallio (1591–1600)

1600–1800

 Ludovico Madruzzo (1600)
 Girolamo Simoncelli (1600–1603)
 Domenico Pinelli (1603–1605)
 Antonio Maria Galli (1605–1608)
 Mariano Pierbenedetti (1608–1611)
 Giovanni Evangelista Pallotta (1611–1620)
 Francesco Sforza di Santa Fiora (1620–1624)
 Odoardo Farnese (1624–1626)
 Giovanni Battista Deti (1626)
 Bonifazio Bevilacqua Aldobrandini (1626–1627)
 Andrea Baroni Peretti Montalto (1627–1629)
 Giovanni Garzia Millini (1629)
 Marcello Lante della Rovere (1629–1639)
 Giulio Savelli (1639–1644)
 Giulio Roma (1644–1645)
 Carlo de' Medici (1645–1652)
 Giulio Cesare Sacchetti (1652–1655)
 Antonio Barberini (1655–1661)
 Girolamo Colonna (1661–1666)
 Giovanni Battista Maria Pallotta (1666–1668)
 Francesco Maria Brancaccio (1668–1671)
 Ulderico Carpegna (1671–1675)
 Virginio Orsini (1675–1676)
 Carlo Rossetti (1676–1680)
 Alderano Cybo (1680–1683)
 Pietro Vito Ottoboni (1683–1687)
 Giacomo Franzoni (1687–1693)
 Nicolò Acciaioli (1693–1701)
 Sebastiano Antonio Tanara (1715–1721)
 Francesco del Giudice (1721–1724)
 Francesco Pignatelli (1724–1725)
 Lorenzo Corsini (1725–1730)
 Pietro Ottoboni (1730–1734)
 Pier Marcellino Corradini (1734–1743)
 Giuseppe Accoramboni (1743–1747)
 Vincenzo Bichi (1747–1750)
 Giovanni Antonio Guadagni (1750–1756)
 Carlo Maria Sacripante (1756–1758)
 Camillo Paolucci (1758–1761)
 Henry Benedict Stuart (1761–1803)

From 1800

 Giuseppe Doria Pamphili (1803–1814)
 Giulio Maria della Somaglia (1814–1818)
 Bartolomeo Pacca (1818–1821)
 Francesco Saverio Castiglioni (1821–1829)
 Emmanuele de Gregorio (1829–1837)
 Ludovico Micara (1837–1844)
 Mario Mattei (1844–1854)
 Antonio Maria Cagiano de Azevedo (1854–1867)
 Niccola Paracciani Clarelli (1867–1872)
 Filippo Maria Guidi (1872–1879)
 Jean Baptiste François Pitra (1879–1884)
 Edward Henry Howard (1884–1892)
 Tommaso Maria Zigliara (1893)

From 1900

 Serafino Vannutelli (1893–1903)
 Francesco di Paola Satolli (1903–1910)
 Francesco di Paola Cassetta (1911–1919)
 Giulio Boschi (1919–1920)
 Giovanni Cagliero, Salesiani di Don Bosco (1920–1926)
 Michele Lega (1926–1935)
 Francesco Marchetti Selvaggiani (1936–1951)
 Federico Tedeschini (1951–1959)
 Gaetano Cicognani (1959–1962)

Titular Cardinal-Bishops

 Amleto Giovanni Cicognani (1962–1973)
 Jean-Marie Villot (1974–1979)
 Paolo Bertoli (1979–2001)
 Alfonso López Trujillo (2001–2008)
 Tarcisio Bertone (2008– )

Bishops of Frascati

 Biagio Budelacci ( –1962)
 Luigi Liverzani (1962–1989)
 Giuseppe Matarrese (1989–2009)
 Raffaello Martinelli (since 2009)

Auxiliary bishops

Marco Antonio Bottoni, T.O.R. (1655–?)
Biagio Budelacci (1936–1962)
Francesco Giacci (1900–1904)
Edward Henry Howard (1872–?)

Notes

References

Books

  (in Latin)
 (in Latin)
  (in Latin)
 
 (in Latin)

 (in Latin)
 (in Latin)

Studies

External links
Suburbicarian Diocese of Frascati Official Website

 
Suburbicarian dioceses
Frascati